Myron Lawrence (May 18, 1799 – November 7, 1852) was a Massachusetts lawyer and politician who served in both branches of the Massachusetts General Court and served as the President of the Massachusetts Senate.

Early life
Lawrence, the son of Benjamin Lawrence, was born in Middlebury, Vermont, on May 18, 1799.

Education
Lawrence attended Addison County Grammar School. In 1820, he graduated from Middlebury College where, from 1851 to 1852, he was a  trustee. Lawrence read law in the office of Hon. Mark Doolittle of Belchertown, Massachusetts.

Legal career
After reading law and passing the Massachusetts Bar, Lawrence practiced law in Belchertown, Massachusetts, until his death on November 7, 1852.

Family life
On March 28, 1824, Lawrence married Clarissa Dwight, daughter of Colonel Henry Dwight and Ruth Rich.

Public service
Lawrence served in the Massachusetts House of Representatives in 1827-1828 and 1849-1850, in the Massachusetts Senate in 1835-1839, 1844–46 and 1852, as the President of the Massachusetts Senate from 1837 to 1840, and as a member of the 1844 commission on the Boundary line between Massachusetts and Rhode Island.

Death
Lawrence died in Belchertown, Massachusetts, on November 7, 1852.

See also
 59th Massachusetts General Court (1838)
 60th Massachusetts General Court (1839)

References

1799 births
1852 deaths
People from Belchertown, Massachusetts
Middlebury College alumni
Members of the Massachusetts House of Representatives
Massachusetts state senators
Massachusetts lawyers
Presidents of the Massachusetts Senate
19th-century American politicians
19th-century Congregationalists
American Congregationalists
19th-century American lawyers